Sternotomis bohemani (often misspelled "bohemanni") is a species of beetle belonging to the family Cerambycidae.

Description
Sternotomis bohemani can reach a body length of about 25 mm. The upper surface of the body is of a pale green colour, varied with white fasciae and patches. Femora and tibiae are green. Antennae are green and longer than the insect.

Distribution
This widespread species can be found in Tropical and Southern Africa.

References

Sternotomini
Beetles described in 1844